The Rivers State Ministry of Transport is the government ministry responsible for matters concerning transportation issues and policy in Rivers State, Nigeria. The ministry has its headquarters on the 9th floor of the State Secretariat Building in Port Harcourt.
 Its current Commissioner is Chief Ibinabo Michael West.

See also
List of government ministries of Rivers State

References

Transport
Rivers State
Ministry of Transport
Transport organizations based in Nigeria